The 2005 Eurocup Formula Renault 2.0 season was the fifteenth Eurocup Formula Renault 2.0 season. The season began at Zolder on 30 April and finished at Monza on 22 October, after sixteen races.

Japanese driver Kamui Kobayashi scored six victories at Bugatti Circuit, Oschersleben, Donington Park, Estoril and Monza during the season, he took the championship at the wheel of his Prema Powerteam-run car. Red Bull-backed driver Michael Ammermüller who competed with Jenzer Motorsport was the only Koboyashi's rival for championship title was not resolved until the final round, and Ammermüller finished in series' standings just eight points behind Japanese driver, winning races at Zolder, Valencia, Bilbao and Oschersleben. SG Formula's  Yann Clairay amassed three wins on his way to third place in the series standings. Motopark Academy's Filipe Albuquerque completed the top five, despite missing Le Mans round.

Teams and drivers

Calendar

Championship standings

Drivers
Points are awarded to the drivers as follows:

Teams

References

External links
 Official website of the Eurocup Formula Renault 2.0 championship

Eurocup
Eurocup Formula Renault
Renault Eurocup